Judge Richards may refer to:

Ian Richards (judge) (born 1975), judge of the Florida 17th Judicial Circuit
Jon Richards (born 1963), judge of the Wisconsin circuit court
Richard Richards (judge) (1752–1823), Welsh Lord Chief Baron of the Exchequer

See also
Justice Richards (disambiguation)